Stuart Richardson (born 15 August 1973) is a Welsh musician. He is the bassist for the rock band No Devotion, formed by former members of Lostprophets and Geoff Rickly of Thursday. He is also the touring bassist for Thursday.

Career
Richardson is an only child. His mother worked in a butchers shop, bar and doctors office, and his dad was a miner. Richardson has said that one of his earliest musical obsessions was David Bowie. He was inspired to learn to play bass by Steve Harris of Iron Maiden.

Richardson's career in the music industry started off in the mid 1990s, working as a producer in his local area in Wales. By the late 1990s he was working as an engineer at Front Line Studios in Caerphilly, which is where he first met the other members of Lostprophets. He replaced Mike Lewis as bassist in Lostprophets after Mike switched to rhythm guitar, joining them in 1998 just before they recorded their third demo. He had worked with the band previously, having produced their first two demos. Lostprophets were signed to Columbia Records and Visible Noise in 2000 and released five studio albums.

In October 2013, ten months after lead singer Ian Watkins was arrested and charged with multiple sexual offences, Richardson and the remaining members of the band announced that they could "no longer make or perform music as Lostprophets". Six months later, they formed a new band, No Devotion, with Geoff Rickly as their new lead singer. The band released their debut album Permanence in 2015. A follow up is currently in the works.

During an appearance on the Sappenin' Podcast with Sean Smith in December 2019, Richardson revealed the reason why they formed a new band. "We didn't catch our breath after the whole thing went down with [Watkins]. So I was like, well 'fuck if that's gonna be the thing that's on my fucking gravestone.' Like 'Oh, that guy was in that band with that fucking prick.' It's like, fuck that. I'm gonna do my own band immediately."

Richardson has been the touring bassist of Thursday since 2017.

Personal life
He is the co-owner of Rocky Water Studios, a studio based in the Eau Galle Arts District of Melbourne Beach, Florida.

Discography

With No Devotion
Permanence (2015)
No Oblivion (2022)

With Lostprophets
The Fake Sound of Progress (EP) (1999)
The Fake Sound of Progress (2000)
Start Something (2004)
Liberation Transmission (2006)
The Betrayed (2010)
Weapons (2012)

Other (selected)
Funeral For A Friend - Memory & Humanity (Backing vocals) (2008)
Attack! Attack! - Attack! Attack! (Producer, Engineer, Mixing) (2008)
Suburban Myth - Sick Feeling (Mixing) (2015)
Bars and Melody - Generation Z (Producer, Mixing, Composer) (2017)
Cyclone Static - From Scratch (Mixing, Mastering) (2019)

References

1973 births
Living people
People from Pontypridd
Welsh guitarists
Welsh rock musicians
Welsh rock guitarists
Bass guitarists
Lostprophets members
21st-century British guitarists
No Devotion members